Alfaroa costaricensis, also known as campano chile, chiciscua, gaulin, gavilán Colorado, or gavilancillo, is nut bearing timber tree in the Juglandaceae family. It is native to the Neotropics, from Mexico, through Central America to Colombia.

Habitat
Alfaroa costaricensis normally grows in cloudy areas on well-drained soils with slopes of 5% or more at elevations between 600 and 2200 m which receive 1500–2500 mm of precipitation and sustain temperatures of 15 to 20 °C.  This tree does not grow well in the shade.

Description
Alfaroa costaricensis is a slow growing tree with pink heartwood. It can reach 27 m in height and 60 cm diameter at breast height (d.b.h.).

The seed is a nut, one-chambered at the apex and eight-chambered at the base, which measures 1.6 to 2.5 cm long and 1.4 to 1.6 cm in diameter, and is protected by a hard, thick, brown pericarp.  Germination is hypogeal. The leaves are pinnately compound, and are distinguishable from other species by their heavy pubescence. The male inflorescences is a panicle, consisting of approximately ten catkins arranged alternately.  The female flowers are sessile on a catkin.

Uses

Timber
Alfaroa costaricensis wood is attractive but difficult to saw and finish.  It is used for furniture, posts, building lumber, and the production of charcoal.

Wildlife food
Rodents consume many nuts.

References

 Manos, P. S., and Stone, D. E., "Evolution, Phylogeny, and Systematics of the Juglandaceae", Annals of the Missouri Botanical Garden, '88(2) 2001, 231-269.

External links

costaricensis
Trees of Guatemala
Trees of Honduras
Trees of Costa Rica
Trees of Panama
Trees of Colombia
Plants described in 1927